The Opel Crossland is a subcompact crossover SUV (B-segment) marketed by Opel since 2017. It is also marketed as the Vauxhall Crossland in the United Kingdom, officially unveiled to the media in January 2017. The car was officially shown at the Geneva Motor Show in March 2017, and was originally known as the Opel and Vauxhall Crossland X. It went on sale in the summer of 2017. At the same time, the Opel Meriva was discontinued, as demand for crossovers and SUVs in the B-segment is continually growing at the expense of compact MPVs.

Overview
The Crossland is built at the Opel factory in Zaragoza, Spain. It is based on a modified version of Groupe PSA's PF1 platform, which is used by the Citroën C3 Picasso and the Peugeot 2008, shared with the Citroën C3 Aircross. The Crossland X received a facelift in 2020 and was renamed to “Opel Crossland”, dropping the "X".

Pre-facelift

Facelift

Powertrains
The Crossland is available with petrol, diesel and LPG engines. The two higher powered versions are turbocharged, and have balance shafts.

Both the  diesel and  petrol models get a six speed manual gearbox; the other engines come with five speed manuals. A six speed automatic is available, in conjunction with the  engine. The LPG model is based on the entry level naturally aspirated petrol engine.

Sales
In March 2018, Opel announced that over 100,000 orders for the Crossland or Crossland X had already been taken.

Notes

References

External links

Crossland X
Mini sport utility vehicles
Cars introduced in 2017